Gabriela Voleková (born 10 March 1981) is a former professional Slovak tennis player.

Voleková won three doubles titles on the ITF circuit in her career. On 19 November 2001, she reached her best singles ranking of world number 191. On 10 July 2000, she peaked at number 180 in the doubles rankings.

ITF finals

Singles (0–9)

Doubles (3–10)

References
 
 

1981 births
Living people
Tennis players from Bratislava
Slovak female tennis players
21st-century Slovak women